András Fekete-Győr (born 13 April 1989) is a Hungarian activist, lawyer and politician. He was the inaugural leader of the Momentum Movement party from 2016 to 2021. Fekete-Győr became a nationally known political figure, when he led the successful NOlimpia campaign against the Budapest bid for the 2024 Summer Olympics, which was one of the first major blows for the national conservative government of Fidesz and its leader Viktor Orbán, who governs the country with a two-thirds majority since 2010.

Under the leadership of Fekete-Győr, the Momentum Movement subsequently was transformed itself into a political party. Although the party failed to reach the 5% threshold in the 2018 parliamentary election, the 2019 EP election and the 2019 local elections saw great successes for the Momentum Movement, which soon became the second or third strongest party within the opposition. Fekete-Győr run as prime ministerial candidate in the 2021 opposition primary, but was forced to resign as party leader because of his poor result in October 2021.

Family
András Fekete-Győr was born into an intellectual family on 13 April 1989 in Budapest. His maternal great-grandfather was jurist and economist Ödön Kuncz (1884–1965), a theorist of mercantile law. His maternal grandfather József Kuncz, also a lawyer, participated in the revolutionary political committee during the Hungarian Revolution of 1956; therefore, he was banned from the national bar association until his political rehabilitation in the 1960s.

His paternal grandfather was agricultural engineer Endre Fekete-Győr (1926–1999), member of the Hungarian Socialist Workers' Party (MSZMP) and Chairman of the Council of Heves County between 1969 and 1981. His father is András Fekete-Győr, Sr. (born 1956), Deputy Managing Director of the National Deposit Insurance Fund (OBA) since 1993, managing director from 2010 to 2018.

Education 
He went to primary school in Solymár and then to the Ferenc Toldy High School, where from he graduated in 2008. He then continued to the Eötvös Loránd University (ELTE) with an Erasmus visit to the Ruprecht-Karls University in Heidelberg, Germany. He earned a degree of law at the Faculty of Law of the  Eötvös Loránd University in 2015.

As a legal trainee, he worked for the law firm of Péter Nagy and László Trócsányi for few months in 2013, then attended in an internship at the International Chamber of Commerce (ICC) in 2014. He worked for the General Electric in Budapest as an accounts receivables manager for four months in 2015. In 2016, he studied political science at the Humboldt University in Berlin as part of a German international parliamentary scholarship.

Political career

Leader of the Momentum 
After working at a few different firms, he decided in January 2014 to return to Hungary to start a political movement. In 2015 the Momentum Movement was founded by 9 people. Fekete-Győr was elected leader of the movement in August 2016. The movement only appeared in public in early 2017, when Fekete-Győr and his supporters initiated the NOlimpia campaign, a signature-collection campaign to stop Budapest's bid to host the 2024 Summer Olympics. The campaign was successful; after NOlimpia collected 266,151 signatures (of 138,000 required to automatically trigger a public referendum), the national government preemptively withdrew the city's bid. After the success, Momentum was soon was transformed into a party; Fekete-Győr was elected its inaugural leader on 4 March 2017. The party held a mass protest on 1 May 2017, the anniversary of Hungary's join to the European Union. Fekete-Győr criticized Viktor Orbán's foreign policy towards Russia and the post-Soviet dictatorships. He also announced that Momentum will participate in the 2018 parliamentary election.

On May 18, 2017, Fekete-Győr caused controversy after he and other Momentum members walked into the offices of pro-government news portal origo.hu without permission. The protesters tried to ask a journalist about an article suggesting—falsely, Momentum claimed—that another leader of the movement had embezzled funds from an earlier start-up venture. Pro-government media portrayed the event as a break-in, and Fekete-Győr as threatening, although independent media (e.g. index.hu) were also critical of Fekete-Győr's tactics.

Under his leadership, the Momentum Movement failed to reach 5% threshold during the 2018 parliamentary election. Subsequently, Fekete-Győr initiated a vote of confidence against himself and the three head directors of the party temporarily took over leadership in May 2018. A majority of the delegates assured him of their support during the vote. In December 2018, during the anti-government protests, Fekete-Győr threw a smoke grenade at police officers at a protest for which he is currently under criminal investigation. He is facing 1 to 5 years of imprisonment. In April 2019, the Momentum was registered for the 2019 European Parliament election. On May 26, 2019, the party obtained 9.86% of the popular vote (becoming the third largest party in the election), thus meeting the 5% threshold: two candidates of the party were elected to the European Parliament. In 2019 local election the party managed to win mayoral positions of three Budapest districts and 29 seats in counties' assemblies (mostly in Pest County).

2021 opposition primary
The Momentum Movement joined the electoral alliance of six opposition parties, which intended to run jointly in the 2022 parliamentary election. Fekete-Győr decided to run as candidate for the position of prime minister in the 2021 opposition primary. Fekete-Győr campaigned for the introduction of 4-day working week and Finnish-type education system. He announced his programme in February 2021, which included the so-called "Felcsút trials" against Prime Minister Viktor Orbán and his corrupt system (NER). He strongly opposed the introduction of the anti-LGBT law and also criticized fellow opposition party Jobbik and its leader Péter Jakab for their support. YouTube channel Partizán conducted an interview with him in April 2021, where he seemed indecisive, uncertain and insincere on many issues, which eroded his popularity during the months of the primary election campaign. He also expressed his rejection of the candidacies of some MSZP politicians in the primary, such as Attila Mesterházy and Csaba Tóth.

Despite his low results in opinion polls, Fekete-Győr announced in August 2021 that he does not to intend to withdraw his candidacy and said the Momentum "is the guarantee of a real regime change" after 2022. During the first prime ministerial debate (12 September), Fekete-Győr argued in favor of the establishment of a National Anticorruption Prosecution Office, which would receive Carmelite Monastery as HQ – the current residence of the Prime Minister's Office. In the second debate (24 September), Fekete-Győr emphasized that Klára Dobrev is less likely to defeat Viktor Orbán because of her husband Ferenc Gyurcsány and their active involvement in pre-2010 politics. During the primary election, Fekete-Győr came to the fifth and last place, obtaining 3.4 percent of the vote, while the Momentum Movement won 15 constituencies and received 21.73% – analysts noted that even the majority of the supporters of the party chose different prime ministerial candidates rather than Fekete-Győr. Because of the poor result, Fekete-Győr initiated a vote of confidence regarding his presidency on 5 October. Two days later, Fekete-Győr announced that his party, the Momentum Movement will support Péter Márki-Zay in the second round. The decision contributed to the withdrawal of Gergely Karácsony's candidacy. On 10 October, the majority of the party's assembly of delegates voted against Fekete-Győr during the vote of confidence. Therefore, he resigned as party leader. He said he is grateful for "every meeting, handshake, conversation, feedback he received as party leader on behalf of the community" and he would do his best for the next president, the Momentum, and the success of the opposition coalition.

Member of Parliament
Although the United for Hungary opposition alliance suffered a catastrophic defeat in the 2022 parliamentary election, Fekete-Győr obtained a mandate via the alliance's national list. He was chosen as leader of the newly formed Momentum parliamentary group. Fekete-Győr announced, MPs of the party will only take the oath, but will then boycott the rest of the inaugural meeting of the 2022–2026 parliament by walking out. Fekete-Győr was replaced as leader of the parliamentary group by the new party president Ferenc Gelencsér in July 2022.

References 

1989 births
Living people
Hungarian activists
21st-century Hungarian lawyers
Momentum Movement politicians
Politicians from Budapest
Members of the National Assembly of Hungary (2022–2026)